Cosmisoma brullei is a species of beetle in the family Cerambycidae. It was described by Mulsant in 1863.

References

Cosmisoma
Beetles described in 1863